Mateo Sanguinetti (born 26 July 1992) is a Uruguayan rugby union player. He was named in Uruguay's squad for the 2015 Rugby World Cup. His position is prop.

In December 2018 he signed with professional American club Houston SaberCats for the 2019 Major League Rugby season.

References

External links

1992 births
Living people
Expatriate rugby union players in the United States
Houston SaberCats players
Rugby union players from Montevideo
Uruguay international rugby union players
Uruguayan expatriate rugby union players
Uruguayan expatriate sportspeople in the United States
Peñarol Rugby players
Rugby union props
Expatriate rugby union players in France
Uruguayan expatriate sportspeople in France
RC Massy players